Gaël Monfils was the defending champion, but he withdrew before his match against German qualifier Mischa Zverev. Gilles Simon won the title, by defeating Zverev in the final, 6–3, 6–2.

Seeds
The first four seeds received a bye to the first round.

Main draw

Finals

Top half

Bottom half

References
 Main draw
 Qualifying draw

2010 Open de Moselle